Spain participated in the ninth Winter Paralympics in Turin, Italy. 

Spain entered nine athletes in the following sports:

Alpine skiing: 5 male, 4 female

Medalists

See also
2006 Winter Paralympics
Spain at the 2006 Winter Olympics

External links
Torino 2006 Paralympic Games
International Paralympic Committee
Comité Paralímpico Español

2006
Nations at the 2006 Winter Paralympics
Paralympics